The men's triple jump event at the 2007 Summer Universiade was held on 13–14 August.

Medalists

Results

Qualification
Qualification: 16.50 m (Q) or at least 12 best (q) qualified for the final.

Final

References
Results
Final results

Long
2007